The Monastery Church, also known as the Church of the Dominican Monastery, is a Gothic church formerly part of a medieval Dominican monastery in Sighișoara, Romania. The monastery was erected in 1289, and demolished in 1888. The monastery was one of a network planned by Paulus Hungarus (Paul the Hungarian) throughout the Kingdom of Hungary to act as a bulwark against heresy. Hungarian nobleman Leonard Barlabássy gave the church an endowment.

References

Bibliography 

 

Sighișoara
Sighisoara Monastery
Sighisoara Monastery
Sighisoara Monastery
Sighisoara Monastery
Sighisoara Monastery